Greg Baldwin is an American voice actor. He is most notable for frequently serving as a voice double for the late Mako Iwamatsu.

Career
Baldwin has worked in the theater extensively as Sidney Lipton in God's Favorite, Mushnik in Little Shop of Horrors, Dr. Zubritsky in Neil Simon's Fools, Count Otto Von Bruno in Bullshot Crummond, and the Baker in The Baker's Wife.

Baldwin voiced Iroh for the final season of Avatar: The Last Airbender and for the second and third seasons of The Legend of Korra. He can also be heard as the ancient Jedi Master Tera Sinube and as Casiss on Star Wars: The Clone Wars. He provided the voice of multiple characters in Lego Star Wars: The Freemaker Adventures, most notably, the voice of Furlac. He voiced Aku in the fifth season of Samurai Jack.

Baldwin performed a substantial portion of Splinter's dialogue in the movie TMNT after Mako died during production. In 2016, he appeared as communist writer Dutch Zweistrong in Hail, Caesar!.

Baldwin first voiced Aku (from Samurai Jack) in the  2009 video game Cartoon Network Universe: FusionFall. Baldwin was credited as the original actor for Atlas/Frank Fontaine, the main antagonist in BioShock; he was replaced by Karl Hanover in the final version of the game, and the character's original Southern drawl was changed into an Irish accent. His voice can also be heard in numerous other video games, including Tom Clancy's Rainbow Six: Lockdown, Assassin's Creed: Brotherhood, F.E.A.R. and Fallout 4.

On April 2, 2021, Baldwin announced that he was cast in an undisclosed original role for the upcoming Disney Television Animation program, The Ghost and Molly McGee. Upon release, Baldwin’s role was later revealed to be one of the members of the Ghost Council.

Personal life
Baldwin currently resides in Albuquerque with his wife Melissa Baldwin. Together they have two children, Sydney and Cooper.

According to an interview with The Dot and Line, Baldwin was able to fill-in for Mako on his voice roles by listening to the cast album of Pacific Overtures, a musical that Mako starred in, which was a personal favorite album of Baldwin’s.

Filmography

Film

Animation

Video games

Live-action

Theatre
 Bullshot Crummond – Count Otto Von Bruno
 God's Favorite – Sidney Lipton
 Little Shop of Horrors – Mushnik
 The Baker's Wife – The Baker

References

External links

Living people
American male stage actors
American male television actors
American male video game actors
American male voice actors
Year of birth missing (living people)